Sodium chromate is the inorganic compound with the formula Na2CrO4. It exists as a  yellow hygroscopic solid, which can form tetra-, hexa-, and decahydrates. It is an intermediate in the extraction of chromium from its ores.

Production and reactivity
It is obtained on a vast scale by roasting chromium ores in air in the presence of sodium carbonate:
2Cr2O3  +  4 Na2CO3  +  3 O2    →   4 Na2CrO4  +  4 CO2
This process converts the chromium into a water-extractable form, leaving behind iron oxides. Typically calcium carbonate is included in the mixture to improve oxygen access and to keep silicon and aluminium impurities in an insoluble form. The process temperature is typically around 1100 °C. For lab and small scale preparations a mixture of chromite ore, sodium hydroxide and sodium nitrate reacting at lower temperatures may be used (even 350 C in the corresponding potassium chromate system). Subsequent to its formation, the chromate salt is converted to sodium dichromate, the precursor to most chromium compounds and materials.  The industrial route to chromium(III) oxide involves reduction of sodium chromate with sulfur.

Acid-base behavior
It converts to sodium dichromate when treated with acids:
 2 Na2CrO4 + 2HCl → Na2Cr2O7 + 2NaCl + H2O

Further acidification affords chromium trioxide:
Na2CrO4  +  H2SO4   →   CrO3  +  Na2SO4  +  H2O

Uses
Aside from its central role in the production of chromium from its ores, sodium chromate is used as a corrosion inhibitor in the petroleum industry. It is also a dyeing auxiliary in the textile industry. It is a diagnostic pharmaceutical in determining red blood cell volume.

In organic chemistry, sodium chromate is used as an oxidant, converting primary alcohols to carboxylic acids and secondary alcohols to ketones. Sodium chromate is a strong oxidizer.

See also
 Chromate and dichromate

Safety
As with other Cr(VI) compounds, sodium chromate is carcinogenic. The compound is also corrosive and exposure may produce severe eye damage or blindness. Human exposure further encompasses impaired fertility, heritable genetic damage and harm to unborn children.

References

Further reading

Chromates
Sodium compounds
Oxidizing agents